The Bidu Sayão International Vocal Competition (Portuguese: Concurso Internacional de Canto Bidu Sayão) is a singing competition held at the city of Belo Horizonte in Brazil named after that country's most famous opera singer, Bidu Sayão. It is a competition open to singers of any nationality for up-and-coming young singers and as such has an age restriction. The competition is divided between male and female participants and is the most important vocal competition in Latin America.

The competition has an international jury composed of conductors, artistic directors from international opera houses and musicologists. The competition was created in 1999 by the opera producer Cleber Papa who is its President.

List of winners

References

External links
 Website

Opera competitions
Singing competitions
Brazilian music